Chocolate Chip is the seventh studio album by American soul musician Isaac Hayes. It was released in 1975 by ABC Records through Hayes' own imprint, Hot Buttered Soul Records, marking Hayes' first release after leaving the then-financially troubled Stax label. The album was Hayes's segue into the emerging disco scene and featured horns and layered beats, while maintaining his traditional soulful vocals. “Chocolate Chip” was certified Gold by the RIAA for sales of over 500,000 copies. It reached number one on the Billboard R&B Albums chart the week ending August 9, 1975 and stayed in the top position for two weeks. It was his seventh and final number one album.

Track listing  
All songs written by Isaac Hayes except where noted.

Charts

Personnel
 Isaac Hayes - arranger, keyboards, producer, vocals
 Emerson Able - flute, alto saxophone
 Ben Cauley - trumpet
 Lewis Collins - flute, tenor saxophone
 Bill Easley - flute, alto saxophone
 Roosevelt "Head" Green - engineer
 Jack Hale - trombone
 Willie Hall - drums
 The Movement - guest artist
 Floyd Newman - flute, baritone saxophone
 Darrell Smith - flute, Tenor saxophone
 Lester Snell - Fender Rhodes
 Errol Thomas - guitar, bass
 Jackie Thomas - trombone
 Fred Valentine - photography

See also
List of number-one R&B albums of 1975 (U.S.)

References

Isaac Hayes albums
1975 albums
Albums produced by Isaac Hayes
ABC Records albums